Davinder Singh Kharoud better known as Dev Kharoud is an Indian actor who works in Punjabi cinema.

Career

Kharoud started his career as a theatre artist and played various roles on stage under the direction of theatre legends like Balraj Pandit, Rajesh Sharma, Samuel John, etc. He has appeared in Punjabi teleserials as well.

In 2012, he was in the news for essaying a character inspired by Balwant Singh Rajoana in the movie Sadda Haq. Kharoud also appeared in the title role of the movie Rupinder Gandhi – The Gangster..?. He also played the character of Rupinder Gandhi in its sequel Rupinder Gandhi 2 - The Robinhood.

He played the lead role in Dakuan Da Munda, a film based on the autobiography of gangster turned writer Mintu Gurusaria.

Filmography

Films

As a producer
Kabbadi Ik Mohhabat

TV serials
Agg De Kalire
Alhna
Jugnu mast mast
Asan Hun Tur Jana
June 85
Koi Pather Se Na Mare
Roop Basant
Khada Pita Barbaad Kita

Music videos

Awards and nominations

References

External links

21st-century Indian male actors
Living people
Indian male television actors
Male actors in Punjabi cinema
People from Patiala
Male actors from Punjab, India
Punjabi people
Indian Sikhs
Year of birth missing (living people)